Tory Michael Pragassa (born 14 October 1996) is a Kenyan swimmer. He competed at the 2014 Commonwealth Games in Glasgow, but did not qualify for the semi-finals of any of his events, finishing 26th in both the 50m breaststroke and 100m breaststroke heats, and 39th in the 50m freestyle heats.

Early career
Pragassa broke five national junior records at the 2012 CASA Inter Clubs Swimming Championship in Mombasa. On 4 June 2012, he clocked 2:06.50 in the 14–15 years' 200m freestyle, beating the previous junior and boys' 2:06.55 record set by David Dunford on 13 March 2004. He then clocked 0:35.81 in the 10–11 years' 50m backstroke event, just shading the boys' 0:35.83 record set by Jason Dunford on 21 February 1998. He shattered the previous junior and boys' 2:23.20 individual medley record set by Kim Jin-woo on 4 October 1998, setting a new time of 2:20.10.

The following year, he won a silver medal at the CANA Zone 3–4 Championships in Lusaka, Zambia, posting a time of 31.93 seconds in the 15–16 years' 50m backstroke event.

References

1996 births
Living people
Sportspeople from Nairobi
Kenyan male swimmers
Swimmers at the 2014 Commonwealth Games
Commonwealth Games competitors for Kenya
Swimmers at the 2015 African Games